Harri Webb (7 September 1920 – 31 December 1994) was a Welsh poet, Welsh nationalist, journalist and librarian.

Early life
Harri Webb was born on 7 September 1920 in Swansea, at 45 Tŷ Coch Road in Sketty, but before he was two the family moved to Catherine Street, nearer the city centre.

University
Webb grew up in a working class environment. In 1938 he won a Local Education Authority scholarship, and went to the University of Oxford to study languages, specialising in French, Spanish and Portuguese – a period of his life to which he made virtually no reference in his writings. While he was at university his studies were affected by the death of his mother; he graduated with a third class degree in 1941.

World War II
At the outbreak of World War II, Webb immediately volunteered for the Royal Navy, and served as an interpreter which included work with the Free French in the Mediterranean region, with periods in Algeria and Palestine, and with action in the north Atlantic. He was demobilised in Scotland in 1946.

Return to Wales
Following his return to Wales in 1947 his life was outwardly uneventful. For some eight years he worked in temporary jobs, including working for the journalist Keidrych Rhys in Carmarthen, and a brief period in Cheltenham.

In 1954 Webb moved to Merthyr Tydfil to work as librarian in its Dowlais area  and, in his own words, to fully absorb himself into the national experience. Two years later he published Dic Penderyn and the Merthyr Rising of 1831, a pamphlet in which he somewhat imaginatively retells the story of the rebellion.

While in Merthyr Tydfil, Webb lived in the squat Garth Newydd, an old house that had been given to the town during the Depression, and subsequently seemingly belonged to nobody; when Webb first moved in it was occupied by a group of pacifists. He lived in the house with Meic Stephens and others, and it became almost a nationalist commune, broadcasting the 'Free Wales' pirate radio station.

After working in Dowlais for then years 'In defiance of any rational career structure' , in 1964 Webb began work at Mountain Ash Library in the Cynon Valley which was previously having been the largest borough in Wales without a public library service. He made innovations such as lending LPs, and buying books and periodicals to appeal to a female readership who were gaining more independence in this era, to some criticism from those wary of modernisation. He continued to work for Mountain Ash Library until 1974. The library has a memorial plaque dedicated to Webb installed in 1997 reading 'poet and librarian, bardd a llyfrgellydd, 1920-1994' unveiled by Meic Stephens and Gwilym Prys Davies.

Written work
Webb's first collection of poetry, The Green Desert, was published in 1969. Webb carried on living in Garth Newydd and commuting to the next valley until 1972, when he moved to Cwmbach near Aberdare, before finally retiring in 1974, the year that A Crown For Branwen appeared.

This was followed by Rampage and Revel in 1977, and finally Poems and Points in 1983, soon after which Webb virtually ceased to write poetry, suffering a serious stroke in 1985.

Webb's poetry is marked by his radical Welsh nationalist politics and a quasi-Christian sensibility. In form it was often simple and comic, in order that it might influence a wide audience.

Later life
Webb remained in Cwmbach before moving into a nursing home in Swansea shortly before his death on New Year's Eve 1994. His funeral was held on 6 January 1995 at St. Mary's Church in Pennard, Gower, where his grave is to be found.

Memorials
In addition to the plaque at Mountain Ash Library  Ty Harri Webb on Dyffryn Road in Mountain Ash is named after Webb on the same road as the old library.

Merthyr Tydfil Library have also held activities to celebrate Webb's life and promote young people's poetry in their programming.

A ceremony was held at Webb's grave marking 100 years since his birth on 7 September 2020 by Guto Ap Gwent and Prys Morgan amongst others.

Bibliography
 Dic Penderyn and the Merthyr Rising of 1831 (1956) 
 [with M. Stephens, P. Griffith] Triad (1963)
 Our National Anthem (1964)
 The Green Desert: collected poems 1950-1969 (1969; repr. 1976)
 A Crown for Branwen (1974)
 Rampage and Revel (1977)
 Poems and Points (1983)
 Tales from Wales (1984)
 Collected Poems, ed. M. Stephens (1995)
 No Halfway House: selected political journalism 1950-1977, ed. M. Stephens (1997)
 A Militant Muse (1998)
 Looking up England's arsehole, ed. M. Stephens (2000)
 The Stone Face and other poems, ed. M. Stephens (2005)

References

Further reading

Wales Arts Review Centenary | A Tribute to Harri Webb, 6 September 2020.

People from Swansea
1920 births
1994 deaths
Anglo-Welsh poets
20th-century Welsh poets
Welsh librarians